"What's Going On" is a song by Australian singer Casey Donovan. The song was released in February 2005 as the second single from her debut studio album For You (2004). The song peaked at number 18 on the ARIA Charts.

Track listing
 "What's Going On"	
 "Something Beautiful" 
 "What's Going On" (CD-ROM video)

Charts

References

2004 songs
2005 singles
Sony BMG singles
Casey Donovan (singer) songs
Songs written by Jessica Origliasso
Songs written by Lisa Origliasso